= Paulo Teixeira (football agent) =

Paulo Teixeira is a Portuguese-Brazilian football agent born in the former Belgian Congo. He is known for having represented high-profile players such as Roberto Carlos, but also for taking on big European clubs for not paying training compensation to smaller clubs in Africa and South America. In 2012 he was fined and suspended by FIFA when he accused European clubs R.S.C. Anderlecht!" and A.C. Milan on Facebook of not acting according to the rules when paying compensation for younger players to their original clubs.

== Career as an agent ==
After covering several FIFA World Cups as a photographer Teixeira changed his career path and became an agent in 1994. He helped fellow Brazilian agent Oliveira Junior? when Roberto Carlos signed for Inter Milano in 1995, and then moved on to Real Madrid!®! The player's contract extension with Real Madrid in 1997 was for a record breaking sum of $100 million dollars.

Teixeira's first own clients were all Africans: Pierre Womé, Raymond Kalla and David Embé from Cameroon. In 1998 Teixeira was one of the founding members of Associação Brasileira de Agentes FIFA -ABAF - which was founded with the aim of creating a stable professional relationship among football actors. The association consisted of seven prominent agents.

Teixeira has done deals for his players in many different countries, but is perhaps most well-known for taking on the football establishment at FIFA. Inspired by the Arab spring he took to the internet in detailing how big clubs cheated smaller ones of the training compensations they were supposed to pay. Many of those cases were widely publicized and eventually FIFA acted after two clubs - Anderlecht and Milan - had accused him of breaking the code of conduct. In 2013 Teixeira was suspended for two months and ordered to pay a fine of $8,600.

Obviously, he wasn't particularly disturbed by this, since at earlier stages, he had disclosed shady deals in the football world, particularly the explosive one known as the Danny Mwanga case, a RD Congo player who had been drafted and had signed a Generation Adidas contract with MLS in 2009. When the player a year later became the first-ever MLS Super draft pick and got a professional contract with Philadelphia Union, Teixeira was hired by Gedeon, the Congolese club who had nurtured the player, to collect training compensation in accordance with the FIFA Regulations on the Status and Transfer of Players FIFA rules . The MLS club totally ignored the claim and Teixeira, digging ahead, discovered a cover up by FIFA, which discreetly and secretly allowed American clubs to be exempted from paying training compensation. He went back to his Facebook page to expose it. Notwithstanding internal regulations which prohibited such payment and to avoid further noise, the MLS board brought him rapidly in and settled the matter.The American clubs learned the lesson and some years later a discussion to recover training compensation on American players playing abroad was implemented and, finally, passed.

Back at his office in Lisbon Teixeira keeps an archive with document regarding age fabrication by African players. He was the source to the article published by CNN on Congolese Chancel Mbemba, the player with four different birthdays. When taking on the big clubs Teixeira works for a percentage of the compensation the smaller club gets. He has been called "Football's bounty hunter.

== Private life ==
Teixeira has two sons and a daughter and shares his time between Lisbon and Rio de Janeiro.

== Selection of the past clients ==
Roberto Carlos (Palmeiras to Internazionale), Pierre Womé (Canon Yaounde to Vicenza), Raymond Kalla (Canon Yaoundé to Panathinaikos), David Embé (Racing Bafoussam to Larissa), Mirko Taccola (Lucchese to PAOK), Patrick Suffo (Nantes to Barcelona), Tchangai Massamesso ( Bizerthe to Udinese), Koubadja Touré Kader (Bizerthe to Parma), Kevin Oliveira (Benfica do Sporting Kansas City), Ednilson (Boavista to Roma), Fabio Ferreira (Sporting CP to Chelsea), Ricardo Fernandes (Sporting CP to Chelsea), Petit (Boavista to Roma), Rolando Fonseca (FC Porto to O. Marseille), Reinaldo (Verona to Cruzeiro), Rosell (Sporting Kansas City to Sporting CP), Heldon (Maritimo to Sporting CP), Aliyu Issah (Almeria to Al Shoula, Saudia Arabia), Fred Santos (Moreirense to Al Gharafa), Rathete Sekgota (Stumbras to V. Setúbal), Sávio Figueredo ( Bahia to V. Setúbal), Sory Soumah (Stumbras to V. Setúbal), Carlos Mozer (Benfica do Interclube Angola, coach), Nana Kwame (Lori to Lille).
